The 1974 Gent–Wevelgem was a one-day cycling classic that took place in Belgium on 9 April 1974. It was the 36th edition of the Gent–Wevelgem race. It was won by 's Barry Hoban in a thirteen-rider bunch sprint.

Results

References

Further reading
 

Gent–Wevelgem
Gent-Wevelgem